Salvelinus is a genus of salmonid fish often called char or charr; some species are called "trout". Salvelinus is a member of the subfamily Salmoninae within the family Salmonidae. The genus has a northern circumpolar distribution, and most of its members are typically cold-water fish that primarily inhabit fresh waters. Many species also migrate to the sea.

Most char may be identified by light-cream, pink, or red spots over a darker body. Scales tend to be small, with 115-200 along the lateral line. The pectoral, pelvic, anal, and the lower aspect of caudal fins are trimmed in snow white or cream leading edges.

Many members of this genus are popular sport fish, and a few, such as lake trout (S. namaycush) and arctic char (S. alpinus) are objects of commercial fisheries and/or aquaculture. Occasionally, such fish escape and become invasive species.

Deepwater char are small species of char living below 80 m in the deep areas of certain lakes. They are highly sensitive to changes in the quality of the water and one species, Salvelinus neocomensis, was driven to extinction in the twentieth century.

Taxonomy 
There are currently three subgenera in the genus Salvelinus: Baione, Cristovomer, and Salvelinus sensu stricto. Baione, the most basal clade in the genus, contains the brook trout (S. fontinalis), and the presumably extinct silver trout (S. agassizii). Cristovomer contains only the lake trout (S. namaycush). All other species are in the subgenus Salvelinus. If the long-finned char (Salvethymus svetovidovi) is considered a member of the genus Salvelinus, it would be classified in the subgenus Salvethymus, adding a fourth subgenus.

Species diversity

As with other salmonid genera, the delimitation of species in Salvelinus is controversial. FishBase in 2015 listed 54 species or subspecies in this genus, many of which have very narrow local distributions.  Fourteen localised species are listed from the British Isles alone, although these traditionally, and still by the national conservation and fisheries authorities, are all considered to represent the widespread Arctic charr (S. alpinus). Twenty species are listed from the Asian part of Russia, including several localised taxa from in each of the Kamchatka, Chukotka and Taimyr peninsulas. One of these is the long-finned char, which phylogenetically is part of the Salvelinus group but has been so far classified into its own monotypic genus Salvethymus.

The Arctic char (S. alpinus) is the most broadly distributed Salvelinus species. It has a circumpolar distribution, and it is considered the most northern of all freshwater fishes. In North America, five relatively well defined species are present, which, apart from the Arctic char, comprise the brook trout (S. fontinalis), bull trout (S. confluentus), Dolly Varden trout (S. malma) and lake trout (S. namaycush).

This listing presents the taxa recognised in FishBase grouped by geography:

Circumpolar
 Salvelinus alpinus (Linnaeus, 1758) – Arctic char

Europe
Central Europe
 Salvelinus evasus Freyhof & Kottelat, 2005
 Salvelinus umbla (Linnaeus, 1758) – lake char
 †Salvelinus neocomensis Freyhof & Kottelat, 2005
 Salvelinus profundus (Schillinger, 1901)
 
British Isles
Scotland and adjacent islands:
 Salvelinus gracillimus Regan, 1909
 Salvelinus inframundus Regan, 1909
 Salvelinus killinensis (Günther, 1866)
 Salvelinus mallochi Regan, 1909
 Salvelinus maxillaris Regan, 1909
 Salvelinus struanensis (Maitland, 1881)
 Salvelinus youngeri (Friend, 1965) – golden char

England and Wales:
 Salvelinus lonsdalii Regan, 1909
 Salvelinus perisii (Günther, 1865)
 Salvelinus willughbii (Günther, 1862)
Ireland:
 Salvelinus colii (Günther, 1863) – Cole's char
 Salvelinus fimbriatus Regan, 1908 – Coomsaharn char
 Salvelinus grayi (Günther, 1862) – Gray's char 
 Salvelinus obtusus Regan, 1908 – blunt-snouted Irish char 
Northern Europe
Iceland and Atlantic islands:
 Salvelinus faroensis Joensen & Tåning, 1970
 Salvelinus murta (Sæmundsson, 1909)
 Salvelinus thingvallensis (Sæmundsson, 1909)
 Salvelinus salvelinoinsularis (Lönnberg, 1900) – Bear Island char
Fennoscandia and Northwest Russia:
 Salvelinus lepechini (J. F. Gmelin, 1789)

Asia
Arctic drainages
 Salvelinus andriashevi L. S. Berg, 1948 – Chukot char
 Salvelinus boganidae L. S. Berg, 1926 – Boganida char
 Salvelinus czerskii Dryagin, 1932 – Cherskii's char
 Salvelinus drjagini Logashev, 1940 – Dryagin's char
 Salvelinus elgyticus Viktorovsky & Glubokovsky, 1981 – small-mouth char

 Salvelinus alpinus erythrinus (Georgi, 1775) – davatchan
 Salvelinus jacuticus Borisov, 1935 – Yakutian char
 Salvelinus taimyricus Mikhin, 1949
 Salvelinus taranetzi Kaganowsky, 1955 – Taranets char
 Salvelinus tolmachoffi L. S. Berg, 1926 – Lake Yessey char
 Salvethymus svetovidovi Chereshnev & Skopets, 1990 – long-finned char: phylogenetically part of the Salvelinus clade]
Pacific drainages
 Salvelinus albus Glubokovsky, 1977 – white char
 Salvelinus curilus (Pallas, 1814) (= S. malma krascheninnikova Taranetz, 1933 – southern Dolly Varden
 Salvelinus gritzenkoi Vasil'eva & Stygar, 2000

 Salvelinus krogiusae Glubokovksy, Frolov, Efremov, Ribnikova & Katugin, 1993
 Salvelinus kronocius Viktorovsky, 1978
 Salvelinus kuznetzovi Taranetz, 1933
 Salvelinus leucomaenis (Pallas, 1814) – whitespotted char
 S. l. leucomaenis (Pallas, 1814)
 S. l. imbrius D. S. Jordan & E. A. McGregor, 1925
 S. l. pluvius (Hilgendorf, 1876)
 S. l. japonicus (=S. japonicus) Ōshima, 1961 – kirikuchi char
 Salvelinus neiva Taranetz, 1933 – Neiva
 Salvelinus schmidti Viktorovsky, 1978
 Salvelinus vasiljevae Safronov & Zvezdov, 2005 – Sakhalinian char

North America
Atlantic drainages
†Salvelinus agassizii (Garman, 1885) – silver trout
Salvelinus alpinus (Linnaeus, 1758) – arctic char
Salvelinus fontinalis (Mitchill, 1814) – brook trout
Salvelinus namaycush (Walbaum, 1792) – lake trout
Pacific & Arctic drainages
 Salvelinus confluentus (Suckley, 1859) – bull trout
Salvelinus malma (Walbaum, 1792) – Dolly Varden trout
 "Salvelinus anaktuvukensis" Morrow, 1973 – angayukaksurak char (= S. malma)

Hybrids
S. alpinus × S. fontinalis – Alsatian char
S. namaycush × S. fontinalis – splake, brookinaw
S. fontinalis × Salmo trutta – tiger trout
S. leucomaensis x O. masou – river mackerel, Kawasaba

References

 Sepkoski, Jack (2002): Osteichthyes. In: A compendium of fossil marine animal genera. Bulletins of American Paleontology 364: 560. HTML fulltext

External links

USGS Nonindigenous Aquatic Fish Database
IUCN Salvelinus umbla

 
Extant Miocene first appearances
Taxa named by John Richardson (naturalist)
Ray-finned fish genera